The 2016–17 season is Al-Masry's 56th season in the Egyptian Premier League which enters its 58th season since its inception in 1948. The club will participate in the Premier League, Egypt Cup, and the CAF Confederation Cup.

Squad

Current squad

2016–17 Egyptian Premier League

Position

Results

Results by round

Match details

2017 Egypt Cup

Round 32

Round 16

Round 8

2017 CAF Confederation Cup

Preliminary round

1–1 on aggregate. Al Masry won the penalty shoot-out and advanced to the 2017 CAF Confederation Cup First round.

First round

FIFA suspended the Malian Football Federation on 17 March 2017. As a result, Djoliba AC could not continue to participate in the tournament and Al Masry won on walkover and advanced to the 2017 CAF Confederation Cup Play-off round.

Play-off round

1–1 on aggregate. KCCA won the penalty shoot-out and advanced to the 2017 CAF Confederation Cup group stage.

Al Masry SC seasons
Egyptian football clubs 2016–17 season